Glenn Paul Howells (born 15 July 1961) is a British architect and a director and founder of Glenn Howells Architects.

Early life
Howells was born in Stourbridge, England and educated in Plymouth.

Practice
His practice, Glenn Howells Architects (GHA), has offices in Birmingham and London. Howells founded his practice in London in 1990 but later moved the main office to Birmingham in 1992. GHA now employs 150 people in its Birmingham and London studios and works across the UK in many sectors including masterplanning, residential, offices, education, retail, health, hotel and leisure.

Early projects included the award-winning Custard Factory, an affordable creative business space in Birmingham for developer Bennie Gray and a series of arts projects including the Market Place Theatre in Armagh, Northern Ireland (which won a RIBA regional award) and the Courtyard Theatre in Hereford.

The practice subsequently expanded into residential and mixed-use regeneration schemes with a series of projects for innovative developer Urban Splash. These included Timber Wharf and Burton Place in Manchester and the remodeling of Birmingham's landmark Rotunda office building into residential use.

Among its public projects is the Savill Building at Windsor Great Park, shortlisted for the 2007 RIBA Stirling Prize. The competition winning scheme run by The Crown Estate, was intended to create a gateway to the listed gardens reflecting the character and quality of the park. The building grouped all visitor facilities under a grid shell roof creating a series of linked spaces. The roof is constructed from larch and clad with green oak from sustainable sources from the Windsor Estate. It is supported by an earth structure on the entrance side which houses ancillary facilities, while the garden side is elevated on legs to take advantage of the views. It opened to the public in June 2006.

Another key public project is the acclaimed English National Ballet at the Mulryan Centre for Dance, winner of the RIBA London Building of the Year 2021 and the Architects' Journal AJ100 Building of the Year 2020. This public-facing, purpose-built facility opens up to a civic square and invites the passers-by in through a ground-floor exhibition and café, which in turn opens up to an atrium that connects to all the levels with a feature stair.

Today, GHA is working on a number of large scale projects and masterplans including thousands of homes as part of the regeneration of London's former docks and the mixed-use redevelopment of the historically sensitive Paradise Circus area of central Birmingham for Argent. In addition, GHA are masterplanning Port Loop, a new canalside community in Birmingham for Urban Splash and Places for People. 

The practice is continuing to work with developer Ballymore by masterplanning former brownfield sites along the River Thames such as Royal Wharf, Riverscape, London City Island in East London and Brentford Waterside in West London.

The practice's design approach was featured in an interview for the RIBA Journal in 2019. In 2018 Glenn Howells was appointed visiting professor at Birmingham City University in its School of Architecture and Design and chair of the Birmingham Hippodrome Board of Trustees.

Howells has often pushed the development of young, local talent and engages with Birmingham teenagers at the practice's annual work experience programme.

Awards

GHA's projects have won a diverse range of awards including those of the Royal Institute of British Architects National Awards, the Architects' Journal AJ100 Building of the Year Award, the Chicago Athenaeum International Architecture Award, the American Institute of Architects Award,  the British Council for Offices, National Homebuilder, Housing Design and RICS awards, Civic Trust and Civic Voice awards, British Construction Industry Awards and Concrete Society and Brick Awards. In 2019 Glenn Howells was awarded the BCO Regional Committee Chair's Award in recognition of outstanding contribution to the regional property industry.

External roles 
Outside his architectural practice, Howells has spent time on a number of boards for creative and education organisations and advised government bodies and local authorities. He delivers lectures and keynote addresses and in 2017 gave a TEDxBrum talk on intensity and density.

Advisory roles:

 2018-present: Birmingham Hippodrome Board of Trustees, Chair
 2017-present: Birmingham City University Board of Trustees, Member
 2005-present: Design:Midlands, Trustee
 2018-present: Ikon Gallery, London Advisory Board Member
 2015-2017: HS2 Design Review Panel, Member
 2011-2017: University of Warwick Estates Committee, Chair
 2009-2017: Ikon Gallery, Chair
 2008-2011: University of Warwick Council, Member
 2006-2018: Birmingham Hippodrome Board of Trustees, Member
 2006-2017: Ikon Gallery, Board Member
 2006-2012: CABE London 2012 Olympic Panel, Member
 2006-2009: Birmingham Prospectus Steering Group, Member
 2000-2015: CABE National Design Review Panel, Member

Education roles:

 2018-present: Birmingham City University, Visiting Professor
 2017-present: Birmingham City University, Trustee
 2010-present: Centre for Alternative Technology, Visiting Lecturer
 2011-2012: Sheffield Hallam University, External Examiner
 2007-2010: Nottingham Trent University, Visiting Professor
 2003-2006: University of Nottingham, External Examiner
 1998-2001: Queen's University, Belfast, External Examiner
 1995-1998: Birmingham City University, Visiting Lecturer

Awards judging:

 2015-2017: RIBA Competitions Judging Panel
 2012-2014: British Council of Offices National Judging Panel
 2003-2010: RIBA National Awards Judging Panel
 2000-2010: RIBA National Awards Panel

Projects

Selected projects include:

Masterplanning
 Royal Wharf, Royal Docks, London
 Paradise, Birmingham,
 Maple Quays, Canada Water, London,
 London City Island
Blackwall Yard, London
Port Loop, Birmingham
Martineau Galleries, Birmingham
Brentford Waterside, London
New Garden Square, Birmingham
Abbey Street, Nuneaton

Housing
 Brick House, Port Loop, Birmingham
Burton Place, Castlefield, Manchester
Elliott Road, Birmingham
 Luna Building, Bermondsey, London
Kent Street, Birmingham
 Maple Quays, Canada Water, London
The Mercian, Birmingham
Octagon, Paradise, Birmingham
 Parkside, Cambridge,
Perry Barr Village, Birmingham
 Printworks, London,
 Rotunda, Birmingham,
 Southside, Birmingham,
Straits Village, Nottingham
 Timber Wharf, Manchester,
 The Triangle, Swindon,
 Urbanest King's Cross, London,
Urbanest Vauxhall, London,
 Wardian, London
Wembley Link, London
Wirral Waters One, Birkenhead

Single Houses
 Glass House, Hampstead
 Moat House, Dorsington

Workplace
 125 Deansgate, Manchester
 Custard Factory, Birmingham
 Eleven Brindley Place, Birmingham
 i9, Wolverhampton
 Maltings Place, Bermondsey, London
 One Centenary Way, Paradise, Birmingham
 One St Peter's Square, Manchester
 Severn Trent Water, Shrewsbury
 Two Chamberlain Square, Paradise, Birmingham
 Ty Admiral, Cardiff

Public and Education
 Alley Theatre, Strabane (with AJA)
 Aspex Gallery, Portsmouth
 Bramall Music Building, University of Birmingham, Birmingham
English National Ballet at the Mulryan Centre for Dance, London
 Lime Street Gateway, Liverpool
Moss House, University College Birmingham
 National Memorial Arboretum, Alrewas, Staffordshire
 National Film and Television School
 Newman University
 Saint Martin's School, Solihull
 Savill Building, Windsor Great Park
 The Courtyard, Hereford
 The Marketplace, Armagh, Northern Ireland
 Westonbirt Aboretum, Tetbury
 Westonbirt Walkway, Westonbirt Arboretum, Tetbury
 Wirral Metropolitan College, Wirral

Retail and Leisure
 Edgbaston Priory Club, Birmingham
 Gloucester Services, Gloucester
 John Lewis, Exeter
 John Lewis, Oxford
Lakeside Activity Centre, Nene Park, Peterborough
One Ratcliff Square, Paradise, Birmingham
Water Pavilions, Canary Wharf, London

Health and Extra Care
 Brassington Avenue, Sutton Coldfield
 Institute of Translational Medicine, Birmingham
 One Bayshill Road, Cheltenham
 TouchBase, Birmingham
 University Hospital Birmingham

References

External links

Glenn Howells presents a talk as a part of the London Festival of Architecture 2008 (video)

Architects from Worcestershire
Living people
People from Stourbridge
1961 births